Doun Penh or Daun Penh (lit. "Grandmother Penh") is a major district (khan) in Phnom Penh, Cambodia. Many major businesses in Phnom Penh like Sorya Shopping Center and Mokod Pich Jewelry Enterprise are located here. According to the 2019 census of Cambodia, it had a population of 155,069.

The district is the commercial hub of Phnom Penh, marked by the Central Market with its unique art deco architecture and several major roads which emanate from and pass near the market. The district is subdivided into 11 sangkats and 134 kroms.

Administration

Places of interest
Khalandale Mall Phnom Penh
FCC Phnom Penh
Independence Monument
National Museum of Cambodia
Norodom Sihanouk Memorial
Royal Railway Station
Phsar Thom Thmey
Royal Palace of Cambodia
Silver Pagoda
Sisowath Quay
Sorya Shopping Center
Wat Botum
Wat Ounalom
Wat Phnom

Education
 Lycée français René Descartes de Phnom Penh in Wat Phnom sangkat

In 2014, due to the large numbers of schools in the areas, there are congestion problems when the schools dismiss classes.

References

Districts of Phnom Penh